dCache is a system for storing and retrieving huge amounts of data, distributed among a large number of heterogeneous server nodes, under a single virtual filesystem tree with a variety of standard access methods. dCache is open source software built in Java and is used by, among others, ten out of fourteen Tier1 sites to CERN to store data from the Large Hadron Collider.

dCache provides methods for exchanging data with backend (tertiary) storage systems as well as space management, pool attraction, dataset replication, hot spot determination and recovery from disk or node failures. Connected to a tertiary storage system, the cache simulates unlimited direct access storage space. Data exchanges to and from the underlying hierarchical storage management system are performed automatically and invisibly to the user. Beside through protocols specific to high-energy physics, data in dCache can be accessed via NFSv4.1 as well as through WebDAV.

References

External links 
 

Distributed file systems
Network file systems
Distributed data storage